Mad Love is the tenth studio album by singer Linda Ronstadt, released in 1980. It debuted at #5 on the Billboard album chart, a record at the time and a first for any female artist, and quickly became her seventh consecutive album to sell over one million copies. It was certified platinum and nominated for a Grammy.

The album reflected the advent in the later 1970s of punk rock and new wave music. Defining their work as a programmatic return of rock music to its original principles, punk and new wave bands rejected the emphasis on virtuosity and high production values favored by the megastars of the decade, ridiculed the anti-establishment claims of lavishly-paid, jet-setting performers and deplored the increasing corporatization and homogenization of rock music. 

Many veteran acts, including Fleetwood Mac, Carly Simon, Heart, Queen, Joni Mitchell and James Taylor, made sincere (and often successful) efforts to revitalize their sound by adopting aspects of the stripped-down, unpretentious D.I.Y. punk and new wave aesthetic.
Mad Love was Ronstadt's response to this trend. 

The album contains three songs by Elvis Costello ("Party Girl", "Girls Talk" and "Talking in the Dark") as well as three tracks from The Cretones' first album, Thin Red Line (1980). Although Ronstadt had regularly recorded edgy material by non-mainstream songwriters, including Elvis Costello’s “Alison,” she hired Cretones guitarist Mark Goldenberg to provide arrangements, play guitar and lend authenticity to the project. The cover art’s brash, hot pink and black ransom-note graphics and the singer’s new spiky, short-cropped hairstyle reinforced Mad Love’s claim to New Wave status.

The carefully-calculated production and promotion of Mad Love reflected the considerable professional risk undertaken by Ronstadt after a succession of multi-platinum hits.  As the queen of ‘70s easy-going pop, Ronstadt was unlikely to impress punk and new wave’s skeptical critics and puritanical audiences. At the same time, her embrace of a highly-ironic, frenetic, radically unelaborated style had the potential to alienate Ronstadt’s huge mainstream audience eager for the latest iteration of the Heart Like a Wheel formula. The inclusion of new material by established superstars who had embraced aspects of punk rock such as Neil Young (“Look Out for My Love”) provided some continuity with Ronstadt’s previous releases.

The record-buying public proved to be more adventurous than anticipated, making Ronstadt’s risk pay off richly. The album‘s singles — the manic, Blondie-esque rocker "How Do I Make You" and the dark, breathless remake of the 1965 ballad "Hurt So Bad” — climbed to the #10 and #8 positions on the Billboard charts in mid 1980, while other tracks like "I Can't Let Go"  received heavy rotation on classic rock FM stations. Mad Love reach #3 on the album charts and sold over one million copies, making it Ronstadt’s seventh consecutive platinum record. For the fourth time, Ronstadt was named Billboard'''s #1 Female Artist of the Year. "How Do I Make You" earned her a Grammy Award nomination in the Best Rock Vocal Performance Female single category.

Ronstadt leveraged the success of Mad Love to compel Asylum Records to greenlight two non-pop/rock projects—a collection of torch standards backed by the Nelson Riddle Orchestra and a collection of classical mariachi music sung in Spanish. Previously deemed commercially unviable by the label, both projects were commercial successes on the scale of Ronstadt’s pop albums.

In 2011, after 31 years, Mad Love'' was taken out of print. The album was reissued in 2012 as part of Warner/Rhino's "Original Album Series,” a boxed set comprising five classic albums, but this series was also discontinued.

Track listing

Personnel 
 Linda Ronstadt – lead vocals, backing vocals (4, 6)
 Bill Payne – keyboards
 Michael Boddicker – synthesizers (10)
 Dan Dugmore – electric guitar (1-6, 8, 9, 10), electric guitar solo (1, 6)
 Mark Goldenberg – electric guitar (1-4, 7-10), backing vocals (1, 3, 7), electric guitar solo (3, 4)
 Danny Kortchmar – electric guitar (5), electric guitar solo (5)
 Mike Auldridge – Dobro (6)
 Peter Bernstein – acoustic guitar (9)
 Bob Glaub – bass
 Russ Kunkel – drums
 Peter Asher – tambourine (4), percussion (9)
 Steve Forman – percussion (9)
 Waddy Wachtel – backing vocals (1, 7)
 Nicolette Larson – backing vocals (3, 4, 9)
 Rosemary Butler – backing vocals (4, 9)
 Kenny Edwards – backing vocals (8)
 Andrew Gold – backing vocals (8)

Production 
 Peter Asher – producer
 Val Garay – recording, mixing 
 Niko Bolas – recording assistant
 Mike Reese – mastering
 Doug Sax – mastering
 Mastered at The Mastering Lab (Hollywood, California).
 Kosh – art direction, design 
 Peter Howe – photography

Charts

Certifications and sales

References

1980 albums
Linda Ronstadt albums
Albums produced by Val Garay
Asylum Records albums
New wave albums by American artists